The Bob Dylan World Tour 1978 was a concert tour by American singer-songwriter Bob Dylan. In 1978, Dylan embarked on a year-long world tour, performing 114 shows in Asia, Oceania, North America and Europe, to a total audience of two million people.

Background
For the tour, Dylan assembled an eight piece band, and was also accompanied by three backing singers. Highlights of the European leg of the tour were Dylan's first concerts in Germany where he had never wanted to play because of the Jews' persecution by the Nazis. However, after concerts at Dortmund and Berlin, he performed on July 1 on the Zeppelinfeld at Nuremberg for 80,000 people. Promoter Fritz Rau had convinced him to perform in Germany. It was the spot where Adolf Hitler had appeared prominently on his "Reichsparteitage", the party convention of the NSDAP. Dylan's stage was placed opposite to the rostrum where Hitler had given his speeches. After the concert, Bob Dylan said that it was a very special event for him, which he had marked by appearing in normal street clothes instead of the usual stage clothes. Eric Clapton, who also appeared at Nuremberg, joined him for two songs at the end of the concert. As a live album had been recorded at Budokan Hall, Tokyo, the Nuremberg concert recording was never officially released but only appeared on Bootleg recordings. Two weeks later, both artists performed again at a mass festival at the Blackbushe Aerodrome in England.

When Dylan brought the tour to the United States in September 1978, he was dismayed the press described the look and sound of the show as a 'Las Vegas Tour', as the European concerts had been a great success. His performances at Madison Square Garden were given a good review by Rolling Stone. The 1978 tour grossed more than $20 million, and Dylan acknowledged to the Los Angeles Times that he had some debts to pay off because "I had a couple of bad years. I put a lot of money into the movie, built a big house ... and it costs a lot to get divorced in California."  It was during the later stages of this tour that Dylan experienced a "born-again" conversion to Christianity, which would become the overriding thematic preoccupation in his music for the next couple of years, such as on the albums Slow Train Coming (1979) and Saved (1980).

Releases
Concerts in Tokyo in February and March were recorded and released as the live double album, Bob Dylan at Budokan. Reviews were mixed. Robert Christgau awarded the album a C+ rating, giving the album a derisory review, while Janet Maslin defended it in Rolling Stone, writing: "These latest live versions of his old songs have the effect of liberating Bob Dylan from the originals."

Set list
This set list is representative of the performance on November 15, 1978 in Inglewood, California. It does not represent the set list at all concerts for the duration of the tour.

"My Back Pages"
"She’s Love Crazy" 
"Mr. Tambourine Man"
"Shelter from the Storm"
"It's All Over Now, Baby Blue"
"Tangled Up in Blue"
"Ballad of a Thin Man"
"Maggie's Farm"
"I Don't Believe You (She Acts Like We Never Have Met)"
"Like a Rolling Stone"
"I Shall Be Released"
"Senor (Tales of Yankee Power)"
"The Times They Are a-Changin'"
"Rainy Day Women ♯12 & 35"
"It Ain't Me Babe"
"Am I Your Stepchild?"
"One More Cup Of Coffee (Valley Below)"
"Blowin' in the Wind"
"Girl from the North Country"
"We Better Talk This Over"
"Masters of War"
"Just Like a Woman"
"To Ramona"
"All Along the Watchtower"
"All I Really Want to Do"
"It's Alright, Ma (I'm Only Bleeding)"
"Forever Young"
Encore
"Changing of the Guards"

Tour dates

References

External links

 BobLinks – Comprehensive log of concerts and set lists with categorized link collection
Bjorner's Still on the Road – Information on all known recording sessions and performances by Dylan

Bob Dylan concert tours
1978 concert tours